Krzysztof Józef Grzegorek (born 5 May 1961 in Sieradz) is a Polish politician. He was elected to the Sejm on 25 September 2005, getting 8,730 votes in 33 Kielce district as a candidate from the Civic Platform list.

Grzegorek was a deputy Minister of Health starting on 21 November 2007, but after accusations of previous misconduct (corruption) he resigned on 2 June 2008.

See also
Members of Polish Sejm 2005-2007

Notes

External links
Krzysztof Grzegorek - parliamentary page - includes declarations of interest, voting record, and transcripts of speeches.

Members of the Polish Sejm 2005–2007
Civic Platform politicians
1961 births
Living people
Members of the Polish Sejm 2007–2011